Bruno Tabacci (born 27 August 1946) is an Italian politician and member of the Chamber of Deputies. He is the president of the Democratic Centre. In the past, he was member of Christian Democracy and served as the president of Lombardy from 1987 to 1989.

Biography
Tabacci was born in Quistello, Lombardy, in 1946. He later graduated in economics at University of Parma and  worked as a consultant in economy and finance. During the early 1980s, he entered in the Ministry of Industry together with Giovanni Marcora and, subsequently, served as head of the Technical Secretariat at the Minister of Treasury with Giovanni Goria.

From 1970 to 1985, Tabacci served for the Christian Democracy (DC) party as city councillor for several municipalities in the province of Mantua, including Mantua itself. From 1985 to 1991, he was regional councillor of Lombardy and from 1987 to 1989 he also served as President of the Region, during which he dealt with the disastrous flood in Valtellina, from July to September 1987. In 1988, he became President of "Alpe-Adria", an association of Alpine and Adriatic Regions, an experience of significant international cooperation with areas in Eastern Europe before the fall of the Berlin wall. In 1990,  he became head of the DC council group and then vice-president of the regional council. In 1991, he served as President of the Committee for restructuring the livestock sector at the Ministry of Agriculture.

After the 1992 Italian general election, Tabacci was elected to the Chamber of Deputies for Mantua–Cremona constituency; during the legislature, he served as member of the Budget Commission and proposer of the Financial Act 1994 laid out by the Ciampi Cabinet.

He was on the board of administration of Eni, Snam, Efibanca. Between 1999 and 2000 he was president of Autocisa (A15 Parma-La Spezia), from which he resigned when he became a Parliamentary candidate.

He was re-elected Parliamentary Deputy in 2001 for the House of Freedoms in  the constituency of Castiglione delle Stiviere. He joined the group UDC (CCD-CDU). In June 2001 he was elected president of the tenth parliamentary commission for production, commerce and tourism.

On 11  December 2001 he was appointed Coordinator of VAST, committee for the assessment of scientific  and technological decisions, by decree from the President of the Chamber.

In August 2002 he was appointed President of the Italian-Mexican co-operation commission.

In 2006 he was re-elected  Parliamentary Deputy for UDC and became a member of the Treasury commission. In 2008 Tabacci founded, together with Savino Pezzotta and Mario Baccini, the White Rose party and was re-elected Deputy among the ranks of the Union of the Centre.

In 2012 Tabacci founded the Democratic Centre and with this party, allied with the PD, was re-elected Deputy in 2013. In 2018 Tabacci granted to More Europe of Emma Bonino the symbol of the Democratic Centre to exempt it from  the collection of signatures,  required by Italian law to present the list for the elections (while the parties that elected MPs in the previous election are exempted). In the 2018 general election he was thus re-elected in the Milano 1 uninominal constituency.

References

External links
Official website 
Bruno Tabacci at the Italian Chamber of Deputies

1946 births
Living people
Politicians from the Province of Mantua
Christian Democracy (Italy) politicians
Italian People's Party (1994) politicians
Democratic Union for the Republic politicians
Christian Democratic Centre politicians
Union of the Centre (2002) politicians
The Rose for Italy politicians
Alliance for Italy politicians
Democratic Centre (Italy) politicians
Deputies of Legislature XI of Italy
Deputies of Legislature XIV of Italy
Deputies of Legislature XV of Italy
Deputies of Legislature XVI of Italy
Deputies of Legislature XVII of Italy
Deputies of Legislature XVIII of Italy
Presidents of Lombardy
University of Parma alumni